List of the National Register of Historic Places listings in St. Lawrence County, New York

This is intended to be a complete list of historic properties and districts listed on the National Register of Historic Places in St. Lawrence County, New York.  The locations of National Register properties and districts (at least for all showing latitude and longitude coordinates below) may be seen in a map by clicking on "Map of all coordinates".  One of the sites is further designated a U.S. National Historic Landmark.



Listings county-wide

|}

Former listing

|}

References

Saint Lawrence County